Floris Radewyns (or Latinized Florentius Radwyn) (c. 1350 – 24 March 1400) was the co-founder of the Brethren of the Common Life.

Life
Floris was born at Leerdam, near Utrecht, about 1350. He passed a brilliant university course and took his M.A. degree at Prague. Returning home, he was installed canon of St. Peter's, Utrecht. For some little time he led a life of pleasure, until converted by a sermon of Gerard Groote.
 
Thereupon he resigned his canonry, placed himself unreservedly under Groote's direction, at his instance was ordained a priest, and accepted a poor benefice at Deventer, where Groote resided. There he powerfully seconded his friend's apostolate, especially among the poor clerical scholars of Deventer, and at his suggestion and in his house the first community of the Brethren of the Common Life was formed. They lived on the income of their book copying, permitting them to teach young men of humbler circumstances who demonstrated a potential for full-time religious life. 
 
It was also from his house that the six brethren who established the Congregation of Windesheim went forth in 1386, and among them John, the elder brother of Thomas à Kempis. Thomas himself was under the immediate care and guidance of Radewyns from his thirteenth to his twenty-first year. He wrote a loving and edifying sketch of his master, wherein he describes Florens as a man learned in the Scriptures and all sacred science, exceedingly devout, humble, simple, zealous, charitable and excessively mortified. His austerities enfeebled his health, possibly hastened his end; he died at Deventer on 24 March 1400.
 
He was commonly regarded among the brethren as a saint. His skull, with that of Groote, is still preserved in the Catholic Church (Broedern Kerk) of Deventer.
 
Of his correspondence remains only one letter, preserved by à Kempis, who also gives us a collection of his notable sayings.

References

External links
 Thomas a Kempis. "The Life of the Reverend Florentius", The Founders of the New Devotion, (translated by J.P. Arthur), Kegan, Paul, Trench, Trubner & Co. Ltd., London, 1905

1350 births
1400 deaths
Dutch Christian clergy
Dutch Renaissance humanists
People from Deventer